London Buses route 52 is a Transport for London contracted bus route in London, England. Running between Willesden bus garage and Victoria bus station, it is operated by Metroline.

History

Route 52 began on 28 March 1923, running from Raynes Park to Ladbroke Grove. The service was changed many times, on 13 Feb 1924 it ran from Wormwood Scrubs to Tooting and later on, on 9 April 1924 the route was revised to run Ladbroke Grove to Victoria. It was extended to Mill Hill in 1932. Later, some services were extended on to Borehamwood on Monday to Saturday peak journeys where it was changed several times: in 1951, it was withdrawn from Warwick Road and Drayton Road to Elstree Way Hotel, but extended back on 3 February 1953, and further extended to Brook Road on 3 February 1954.

Another extension took the route to Rossington Avenue on Sundays from 1956. Seven years later this was extended to include Monday to Friday peak workings. In 1967 the Mill Hill terminus was changed from Mill Hill Green Man to the rebuilt Mill Hill Broadway Station. The route was then withdrawn beyond Mill Hill Broadway in 1969, the Borehamwood - Mill Hill section being replaced by route 292. Frequency cuts led to over 2,000 passengers signing a petition for the improvement of route 52 in the same year.

In December 1993 the contract to run the route was won by London Coaches, who in July 1994 transferred the route to its Atlas Bus & Coach subsidiary as it had a garage in Willesden, close to the route's terminus. Atlas operated the route with Leyland Titans in a route-specific livery. In November 1994, route 52 was included in the sale of Atlas Bus & Coach to Metroline. 

On 8 December 2012, route 52 was retained by Metroline.

On 17 November 2016, 14 people were injured as a bus on route 52 mounted a pavement and crashed into Kensal House on Ladbroke Grove.

Current route
Route 52 operates via these primary locations: 
 Willesden bus garage 

Kensal Rise station 
Ladbroke Grove Sainsbury's
Ladbroke Grove station 
Notting Hill Gate station 
Kensington Church Street for High Street Kensington station 
Kensington Palace
Palace Gate
Royal Albert Hall
Knightsbridge station 
Hyde Park Corner station 
Victoria bus station  for Victoria station

References

External links

Timetable

Bus routes in London
Transport in the London Borough of Brent
Transport in the City of Westminster
Transport in the Royal Borough of Kensington and Chelsea